Seabury is both a surname and a given name. Notable people with the name include:

Surname:
Ruth Isabel Seabury (1892–1955), American missionary, writer and educator
Samuel Seabury (1729–1796), American Episcopal bishop
Samuel Seabury (1801–1872), rector of the Church of the Annunciation in New York City
Samuel Seabury (judge) (1873–1958), judge of the New York Court of Appeals

Given name:
Seabury Ford (1801–1855), Governor of Ohio
Seabury C. Mastick (1871–1969), New York politician
Seabury Quinn (1889–1969), American pulp fiction author